Countess Sarah (Italian:La contessa Sara) is a 1919 Italian silent film directed by Roberto Roberti and starring Francesca Bertini.

Cast
 Francesca Bertini 
 Sandro Salvini
 Alberto Albertini 
 Vittorio Bianchi 
 Emma Farnesi 
 Giuseppe Farnesi 
 Raoul Maillard 
 Ugo Piperno

References

Bibliography
 Abel, Richard. Encyclopedia of Early Cinema. Taylor & Francis, 2005.

External links

1919 films
1910s Italian-language films
Films based on French novels
Films based on works by Georges Ohnet
Films directed by Roberto Roberti
Italian silent short films
Italian black-and-white films